Sinyan Shen (born November 12, 1949 - died November 7, 2016) was a Singaporean physicist and classical composer.

Life
Born in Singapore to the parents of Shanghai background, Sinyan Shen studied music at a very early age and mastered the vertical fiddle family of instruments. His dual career in music and physics culminated in the development of cultural acoustics, a discipline addressing scientifically the cultural molding of our ears and brain to music. Shen's life work centered on the essence of music.

Shen, who lived in Illinois, taught cultural acoustics at Northwestern University and Harvard University. He was a music director of the Silk and Bamboo Ensemble and the Chinese Classical Orchestra. Both ensembles toured internationally under the auspices of the Chinese Music Society of North America, but have not performed publicly since 2006. Shen was an editor of the international journal Chinese Music, music authority for the Encyclopædia Britannica, and a Fulbright Scholar. He served as a technical advisor for the Shanghai Musical Instrument Factory. He died in Palo Alto, California at the age of 67, several years after suffering a debilitating stroke.

Works
Shen's works include A Tune of Southern Anhui and Moon over the Western Water (for silk and bamboo ensemble), Lily Blossoms Crimson and Bright (for Chinese classical orchestra), and The Stream (vocal). He is the author of What Makes Chinese Music Chinese?, Foundations of the Chinese Orchestra, Acoustics of Ancient Chinese Bells, Chinese Music and Orchestration: A Primer on Principles and Practice, and China: A Journey Into Its Musical Arts and Chinese Musical Instruments.

Orchestral works performed or recorded by Shen Sinyan:

 A Tune of Southern Anhui
 Moon over the Western Water
 Lily Blossoms Crimson and Bright
 The Stream
 Clouds and Mists over the Xiao and Xiang Rivers (XiaoXiang ShuiYun)
 Wild Geese Descending on the Sandy Shores
 Ambush on All Sides
 Wailful Wrath by the River (Jiang He Shui)
 Music at Sunset
 Flower and Moon over the Spring River
 Days of Emancipation
 By the Qiantang River
 Listen to the Pine
 The Moon on High
 The Dance of Yao
 Song North of the Border (Sai Shang Qu),
 Galloping on the Prairie
 Ma-An Mountain Overture,
 Moon Over the Mountain Pass
 The Moon Mirrored in Erquan
 Jasmine Blossom
 Birds Return to the Woods
 Moderately Embellished Six Measures
 Wedding Processional
 Purple Bamboo Melody
 Unforgettable Water Splashing Festival
 Spring at the Emerald Lake
 Rain Falls on the Plantains
 The Little Cowherd
 Plum Blossom (Meihua Sannong)
 The Great Wall
 Fishing Song of the East China Sea
 Fantasy on the Sanmen Gorge
 The Dagger Society Suite
 Receiving My Kinsmen
 On the Prairie

References

External links

 Sinyan Shen official site
 Gateway to The Chinese Classical Orchestra

20th-century classical composers
American physicists
Harvard University faculty
Northwestern University faculty
Musicians from Shanghai
1949 births
Male classical composers
2016 deaths
20th-century male musicians